

Medalists

Standings
Men's Competition

References
Complete 1975 Mediterranean Games Standings Archived

1975 in water polo
Sports at the 1975 Mediterranean Games
1975
1975